Zincophorin (also known as griseochelin) is an antibiotic against Gram-positive bacteria and a bacterial metabolite. It is also an ionophore. It was isolated from the bacterium Streptomyces griseus.

References 

Antibodies